Raj Bhavan (translation: Government House) is the official residence of the governor of Madhya Pradesh. It is located in the capital city of Bhopal, Madhya Pradesh.

History
In 1880, Sultan Shah Jahan, Begum of Bhopal constructed the present Raj Bhavan as a place of stay for the British officers. It was initially named Lal Kothi.  Thus, 1880 onwards, Lal Kothi became the official residence of the British Political Agents posted at Bhopal.

Commissioner Period
On 1 June 1949 Bhopal was merged with the Union of India ending the  princely rule of 250 years. 

The Government of India appointed an administrative head for Bhopal, called the Chief Commissioner and Lal Kothi was chosen as the official residence of the Chief Commissioner and was renamed Commissioner House 

The Lal Kothi  served as a Commissioner House from  1 June 1949 to 1 December 1956.

Formation of Madhya Pradesh
The States Reorganisation Act of 1956, Bhopal state was integrated into the state of Madhya Pradesh, and Bhopal was declared as its capital.

The Government of India appointed Governors of Madhya Pradesh as the head of the state and Lal Kothi was once again chosen as the official residence of the Governors of Madhya Pradesh.

The Commissioner House was renamed as Raj Bhavan. Since then it has served as the official residence of the Governors of Madhya Pradesh.

Building

It was the first Kothi in the city of Bhopal with roof made of red China clay 'Kavelus' and  the predominant colour of the Kothi was red. For these reason they named this building Lal Kothi.

A prevalent custom in the then erstwhile State of Bhopal (a Muslim State) was that whenever the State or the feudal lords constructed any building, the foundation stone for a masjid was laid first. Thus, a small mosque was built first  around the campus of Lal Kothi.
    
The erstwhile Bhopal Government had sought the help of the British and PWD authorities in decorating the Kothi on European lines.

See also
  Government Houses of the British Indian Empire

References

External links
 Official Web Site of Raj Bhavan

Governors' houses in India
Buildings and structures in Bhopal
Government of Madhya Pradesh
1880 establishments in India